= Museum für dörfliche Alltagskultur =

Coordinates: 49°10′25.6″N 7°12′25.9″E

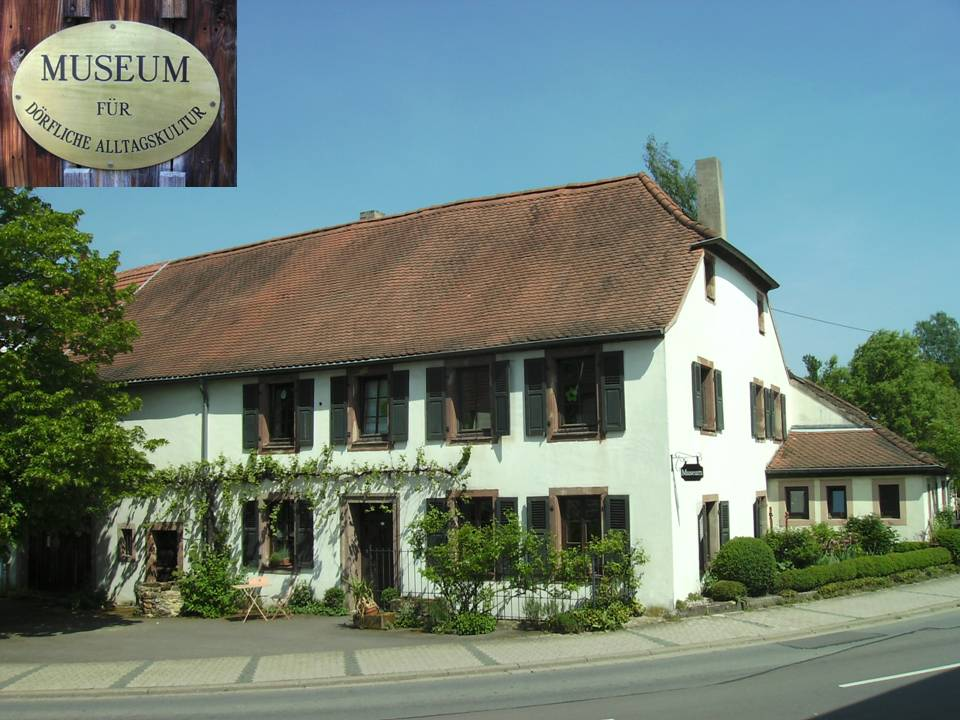

Museum für dörfliche Alltagskultur (English: Museum of daily village culture) is a museum in Saarland, Germany.
